Dark of the Moon: Poems of Fantasy and the Macabre is a poetry anthology edited by August Derleth and published in 1947 by Arkham House in an edition of 2,634 copies.  It is a pioneering anthology of odd poetry from the Middle Ages to the present, arranged chronologically.

A publishing curiosity is that this book had two different dustjackets – the only Arkham House book to have this feature. Both states of the jacket feature a background photograph of a mountain, although on the two jackets the image is reversed as compared with each other. The first-state jacket has lettering in green, whereas the second state jacket is lettered in orange and white. The jacket with the green lettering is the first state of the dustjacket (pictured right). Its lettering was rendered by Wisconsin artist Frank Utpatel. This state is the rarer of the two jackets, since a large number of the Utpatel jackets were destroyed by silverfish during storage. The second state dustjacket (orange and white lettering) was redesigned by Gary Gore, who from 1959 on, became increasingly more active in working with August Derleth on Arkham House covers.

Poets included
William Blake
Robert Burns
James Hogg
Sir Walter Scott
Samuel Taylor Coleridge
Thomas Moore
Richard Harris Barham
Johann Wolfgang von Goethe
John Keats
Thomas Lovell Beddoes
Rabbi Ben Levi
Henry Wadsworth Longfellow
Edgar Allan Poe
Alfred, Lord Tennyson
William Bell Scott
J. Sheridan Le Fanu
Charles Kingsley
Sidney Thompson Dobell
William Allingham
Charles Godfrey Leland
Fitz-James O'Brien
Dante Gabriel Rossetti
James Thomson
William Morris
Richard Garnett
Robert Buchanan
Christina Rossetti
A.P. Graves
James Whitcomb Riley
Lizette Woodworth Reese
A. E. Housman
José Asunción Silva
Dora Sigerson Shorter
Edwin Arlington Robinson
Arthur Guiterman
Walter de la Mare
Amy Lowell
Robert Frost
Josephine Daskam Bacon
Joyce Kilmer
William Rose Benet
Vincent Starrett
Roy Helton
H. P. Lovecraft
Robert P. Tristam Coffin
Clark Ashton Smith
Timeus Gaylord
Mark Van Doren
Arthur Inman
Stephen Vincent Benet
Frank Belknap Long
Yetza Gillespie
Francis Flagg
Dorothy Quick
Robert E. Howard
Donald Wandrei
August Derleth
Anthony Boucher
Byron Herbert Reece
Duane W. Rimel
Mary Elizabeth Counselman
Leah Bodine Drake
Harvey Wagner Flink
Coleman Rosenberger

Publication history
1947, US, Arkham House , Pub date 1947, Hardback
1969, US, Books for Libraries Press , Pub date 1969
1976, US, Granger , Pub date 1976

Notes

References

1947 poetry books
1947 anthologies
American poetry anthologies
Books by August Derleth